Platydemus is a genus of large predatory land planarians in the tribe Rhynchodemini.

Description 
Species of the genus Platydemus are characterized by a massive, slightly convex body with a broad creeping sole and very large eyes. The copulatory apparatus has a large chamber with folded epithelium in the male atrium, usually with a small penis.

Species 
The genus Platydemus includes the following species:
 Platydemus bivittatus von Graff, 1899
 Platydemus fasciatus (Spencer, 1892)
 Platydemus grandis (Spencer, 1892)
 Platydemus joliveti de Beauchamp, 1972
 Platydemus lividus von Graff, 1899
 Platydemus longibulbus de Beauchamp, 1972
 Platydemus macrophthalmus von Graff, 1899
 Platydemus manokwari de Beauchamp, 1963 – "New Guinea flatworm"
 Platydemus pindaudei de Beauchamp, 1972
 Platydemus vanheurni de Beauchamp, 1929
 Platydemus victoriae (Dendy, 1890)
 Platydemus zimmermanni de Beauchamp, 1952

References 

Geoplanidae
Rhabditophora genera